The following Union Army units and commanders fought in the Battle of Opequon in the American Civil War. The Confederate order of battle is listed separately. The battle was fought on September 19, 1864 near Winchester, Virginia, and Opequon Creek. The battle is also known as the Third Battle of Winchester and the Battle of Opequon Creek.

Abbreviations used

Military rank
 MG = Major General
 BG = Brigadier General
 Col = Colonel
 Ltc = Lieutenant Colonel
 Maj = Major
 Cpt = Captain
 Lt = Lieutenant
 Bvt = Brevet

Other
 w = wounded
 k = killed
 c = captured

Army of the Shenandoah

MG Philip Sheridan, Commanding
 Staff: Maj George Alexander Forsyth

VI Corps

MG Horatio Wright

Army of West Virginia

BG George Crook

Note: Thoburn's 2nd Brigade was detached to guard wagons and field hospitals.

XIX Corps

BG William H. Emory

Cavalry Corps
BG Alfred T. A. Torbert

Notes

Footnotes

Citations

References

 
 

American Civil War orders of battle
Valley campaigns of 1864